An indirect presidential election was held in Malta on 1 April 2014. Labour Party MP and Minister of the Family and Social Solidarity Marie-Louise Coleiro Preca was unanimously elected to become the next President of Malta on 4 April 2014.

References

2014 elections in Europe
2014
Presidential election